Rodrigo Nahuel Erramuspe (born 3 May 1990) is an Argentine professional footballer who plays as a centre back for Greek Super League club PAS Giannina.

References

1990 births
Living people
Argentine footballers
Argentine expatriate footballers
Club Atlético Lanús footballers
Club Atlético Huracán footballers
Atlético de Rafaela footballers
L.D.U. Quito footballers
Club Atlético Tigre footballers
Unión de Santa Fe footballers
Independiente Medellín footballers
Club Nacional de Football players
Club Blooming players
Club Atlético Belgrano footballers
PAS Giannina F.C. players
Argentine Primera División players
Primera Nacional players
Categoría Primera A players
Uruguayan Primera División players
Bolivian Primera División players
Super League Greece players
Argentine expatriate sportspeople in Ecuador
Argentine expatriate sportspeople in Colombia
Argentine expatriate sportspeople in Uruguay
Argentine expatriate sportspeople in Bolivia
Argentine expatriate sportspeople in Greece
Expatriate footballers in Ecuador
Expatriate footballers in Colombia
Expatriate footballers in Uruguay
Expatriate footballers in Bolivia
Expatriate footballers in Greece
Association football defenders
Sportspeople from Mar del Plata